The Balochistan women's cricket team is the women's representative cricket team for the Pakistani province of Balochistan. They competed in the Women's Cricket Challenge Trophy in 2011–12 and 2012–13.

History
Balochistan competed in the Twenty20 Women's Cricket Challenge Trophy in its first two seasons, in 2011–12 and 2012–13. They finished second in their group in both seasons, winning one match and losing one match in both tournaments.

Players

Notable players
Players who played for Balochistan and played internationally are listed below, in order of first international appearance (given in brackets):

 Sajjida Shah (2000)
 Armaan Khan (2005)
 Sabahat Rasheed (2005)
 Almas Akram (2008)
 Nahida Khan (2009)
 Sukhan Faiz (2009)
 Shumaila Qureshi (2010)
 Elizebath Khan (2012)
 Muneeba Ali (2016)
 Omaima Sohail (2018)
 Saba Nazir (2019)

Seasons

Women's Cricket Challenge Trophy

See also
 Balochistan cricket team

References

Women's cricket teams in Pakistan
Cricket in Balochistan, Pakistan